Osta or OSTA may refer to:

People
 Benedict John Osta (1931–2014), Indian Roman Catholic archbishop
 Clairemarie Osta, French ballet dancer
 Eduardo Osta (born 1959), Spanish tennis player 
 Jean d'Osta (1909–1993) Belgian writer, journalist, and humorist
 Pavlina Osta (born 1997), American radio personality

Acronym
Ontario Student Trustees' Association
Optical Storage Technology Association

See also
ÖStA (Österreichisches Staatsarchiv, National Archives of Austria)

Occupational surnames